Weedstock was a cannabis rights music festival in the United States, originally held annually near Madison, Wisconsin from 1988 to 2001.

The festival was initiated and organized by Yippie and cannabis activist Ben Masel, and was held for fourteen years despite repeated incidents of attempted police interference.

Weedstock was reintroduced as an annual music festival in Delaware. The event, held every year since 2017, is sponsored by DE NORML, the local chapter of the National Organization for the Reform of Marijuana Laws.

Masel was a well-known cannabis activist. He ran for political office many times, including against Wisconsin incumbent governors and U.S. senators. He died in 2011.

References

Further reading

Bridgeford, Brian (December 5, 2001) Weedstock case goes up in smoke Baraboo News Republic

External links 

 Weedstock website

1988 establishments in Wisconsin
1988 in cannabis
Annual events in Wisconsin
Cannabis culture
Cannabis events in the United States
Cannabis in Wisconsin
Culture of Madison, Wisconsin
Festivals established in 1988
Festivals in Wisconsin